The 2023 Cherokee Nation principal chief election will be held on June 3, 2023 concurrently with the 2023 Cherokee Nation tribal council elections, with a runoff on July 8 if necessary, to elect the Principal Chief of the Cherokee Nation. The election will be nonpartisan. Incumbent principal chief Chuck Hoskin Jr. is running for re-election to a second term in office with incumbent deputy chief Bryan Warner as his running mate.

Candidates

Declared
David Cornsilk, genealogist and former Bureau of Indian Affairs researcher
Cara Cowan Watts, former tribal councilor and candidate for principal chief in 2015
Running mate: David Walkingstick, former tribal councilor and candidate for principal chief in 2019
Chuck Hoskin Jr., incumbent principal chief
Running mate: Bryan Warner, incumbent deputy chief

Results

References

External links
Official campaign websites
 Cara Cowan Watts for Principal Chief
 Chuck Hoskin Jr. for Principal Chief
 Wes Nofire for Principal Chief

Cherokee Nation principal chief
Cherokee Nation elections
2023 Oklahoma elections